The Very Best of Earth, Wind & Fire is a compilation album by American band Earth, Wind & Fire released in 1992 on Telstar Records. The album peaked at No. 40 on the UK Albums Chart. It was reissued in 1996 as Boogie Wonderland: The Very Best of Earth, Wind & Fire, reaching No. 29 on that same chart.

Overview
British soul singer Gabrielle listed The Very Best of Earth, Wind & Fire at No. 18 on a list of her top 20 albums of all time.

Track listing

Charts

References

1992 greatest hits albums
Earth, Wind & Fire compilation albums
Albums produced by Maurice White
Telstar Records albums